Nortt / Xasthur is a split album by the American one man band Xasthur and the Danish one man band Nortt. This split album was re-issued on CD and LP by Southern Lord Records with different artwork. The LP version is limited to 1000 copies: 300 on clear vinyl and 700 on black vinyl.

Track listing
 Nortt – "Hedengangen (intro)" – 1:54  
 Nortt – "Glemt" – 7:37  
 Nortt – "Død og borte" – 5:53  
 Nortt – "Dystert sind (outro)" – 2:21
 Xasthur – "A Curse for the Lifeless" – 4:28  
 Xasthur – "Blood from the Roots of the Forest" – 10:24  
 Xasthur – "Lurking in Silence" – 4:24

External links
Xasthur / Nortt - Split-album @ Xasthur Official Website

2004 albums
Split albums
Xasthur albums
Nortt albums